Hero is the debut Japanese studio album (seventh overall) of South Korean boy band Super Junior, released on July 24, 2013 under Avex Trax in Japan. The album placed first in the Oricon Daily Chart on its first day of sales.

Background
After releasing a series of singles ("Bonamana", "Mr. Simple", "Opera", "Sexy, Free & Single"), the group released their first Japanese album on July 24, 2013, coinciding their Super Show 5 in Tokyo that same week. Although the singles were not considered by their management label SM Entertainment as their official Japanese promotional efforts, all the singles sold favorably. Most were within top two of the Oricon Weekly Singles Chart and three were certified Gold by the RIAJ for selling over a hundred thousand copies in Japan. Most of their Japanese releases came out to coincide with their concert in the country that week.

The album's first disc comprises thirteen tracks (with one being a bonus track). The second disc contains Japanese versions of the group's subgroup singles and its b-sides, and the DVD contains music videos, behind-the-scenes of music video making, and live performances from their recent concert in Japan, specifically from a-nation and subgroup Super Junior K.R.Y. Special Winter Concert.

Promotion
Super Junior had release events in Tokyo and Osaka during August and promoted 'Hero' during Super Show 5 at Tokyo Dome, Tokyo, July 27 and 28, and through A-Nation. Super Junior had a meeting with E.L.F Japan official fan club members at Saitama Super Arena in September to promote the album. A day before the release, Shinjuku station was covered with Super Junior's promotional advertisements, as well Shibuya Tsutaya.

Commercial performance
A month before the release, "Hero" was  #3 in Tower Records pre-order charts. By July 1, the CD-only version was sold out in E.L.F Japan store.

On 24 July 2013 the album debuted at number one in the Oricon Daily Album Chart, selling 52,232 copies on the first day. In the first week of sales "Hero" debuted at the second spot of the Oricon Weekly Albums chart with 102,224 copies, just behind rock group Ikimonogakari's "I" at the top spot by almost 10,000 copies.

Track listing

CD
The version of the song Our Love is a Japanese remake of the re-arranged SS4 version of the original song off the Don't Don album. The original version of Hero, the twelfth track in this album, has vocals featuring member Yesung, while the "performance version" of the song (the bonus track) has all of Yesung's vocals replaced by other member Ryeowook, this being the one used in the music video of the song.

DVD

Release history

Chart

Oricon

Sales and certifications

References

External links
 official Japanese Avex website of Super Junior

2013 albums
Super Junior albums
Avex Group albums
Japanese-language albums